The Evangelical Church of the Augsburg Confession in Slovenia is a Lutheran denomination in Slovenia. It is led by Bishop Leon Novak. It is a member of the Lutheran World Federation, which it joined in 1952. It is also a member of the Conference of European Churches and the Community of Protestant Churches in Europe. It is one of a few Eastern Lutheran churches which use the Byzantine Rite.

External links 
 
Lutheran World Federation listing

Lutheran World Federation members
Churches in Slovenia
Lutheranism in Europe
Lutheran denominations